The United States national rugby league team represents the United States in international rugby league football competitions. The team is managed by the USA Rugby League (USARL).

The United States competed with little success in some international games during the 1950s, but did not return to consistent competition until 1987. With the establishment of the American National Rugby League (AMNRL) in 1997, the team began to participate in more regular international competition, reaching the quarterfinals of the 2013 Rugby League World Cup. In 2014, the USARL became the national governing body for rugby league in the U.S.

History

Early years
One of the earliest attempts to introduce rugby league to the United States was in 1953, when wrestling promoter, Mike Dimitro was asked to organize a tour of Australasia by an American rugby league team.

The team, known as the American All-Stars, was given a huge schedule that included 26 matches against Australian and New Zealand sides. None of the 22 American players had played rugby league before the tour, and they presented themselves in American football-like attire early on in the tournament. The team won six games and tied two.

Their second match of the tour, against a Sydney side, drew a crowd of 65,453 at the Sydney Cricket Ground. After a consistent lack of competition, crowds were good, but never reached the great height that the match at the SCG did.

The tour did not in turn bring any benefits to American rugby league. However, Mike Dimitro did not give up; he was able to organise two exhibitions against Australia and New Zealand in California that did not turn out to be a big success.

1987–1999: Revival
In 1987, the United States played their first international game since 1954 against Canada and built upon this by competing in the World Sevens tournaments between 1997 and 2002.

In 1997, Super League America, who organised the national team, were dissolved and replaced by the American National Rugby League in 2001. The United States Tomahawks warmed up for the 2000 Emerging Nations World Cup with a three-match trip to New South Wales, Australia. On Friday August 11, they took on Forster XIII, drawn from Forster’s two clubs, the Hawks and the Dragons. The Americans were defeated 32–12. They also played the South Sydney Rabbitohs at the old Redfern Oval during Souths' appeal to return to the Australian NRL.

2000–2010: Regular competition

In 2001, as a response to the September 11 attacks, the AMNRL set up a rugby league match between local USA born players (USA All Stars) and AMNRL players who were born overseas (World Allies All Stars). The match was won by the USA All Stars 27–26. Proceeds from the game were donated to the Red Cross to help with cleanup operations. Since 2002, the Tomahawks have been playing regular international competition in the United States. In 2002, the United States were defeated by Russia 54–10 in front of over 5,000 spectators in Moscow.

On December 1, 2004, the Tomahawks played their first ever international game against the Australian Kangaroos, the reigning World Cup champions. The game was known as the Liberty Bell Cup and was played at Franklin Field at the University of Pennsylvania and was played on a grid iron size synthetic field (Fox Sports Australia commentators Warren Smith and former Australian captain Laurie Daley reported that the Kangaroos were not too enthused about playing on the synthetic turf). It was also played in 20 minute quarters rather than the normal 40 minute halves. The Tomahawks shocked the Australians by quickly racing to a 12-0 lead in the first quarter. A third converted try just 4 minutes into the 2nd quarter saw Americans lead by the unbelievable score of 18-0 until replacement forward Petero Civoniceva sent fullback Matthew Bowen on a 60-metre run to score under the posts with 5 minutes remaining in the first half. However, a fourth converted try saw the home side lead by the World Champions 24-6 at half time. The Americans actually led for most of the game until the Kangaroos' superior fitness saw them rally in the last quarter of the game to win 36–24. Although they lost the game, many consider this to be the American's finest moment in international rugby league competition.

In October 2006, the USA were to participate in qualifying for their first World Cup. They were placed in a four team Atlantic qualifying pool along with South Africa, West Indies and Japan. South Africa and the West Indies withdrew from qualifying so therefore the group was reduced to a single game between the US and Japan which the USA won 54–18. They then advanced to play Samoa in the Repechage Semi Final where they lost 42–10 to Samoa. Despite playing well against Samoa and coming within two games of qualifying for the World Cup, the United States were dropped from 14th down to 15th place when the new world rankings were released after the tournament.

In 2009 and 2010 the United States hosted other emerging North American teams in the Atlantic Cup.

2011–2013: First World Cup
In 2011, seven teams in the AMNRL domestic competition broke away to form the USA Rugby League. The AMNRL denied selection to players affiliated with USARL teams, including players who had been selected for the Tomahawks previously.

In 2012, the USA entered World Cup qualifying for the second time in another bid to qualify for their first World Cup in 2013. They began with a comprehensive 40–4 victory over the South Africa in Philadelphia, and followed it up with a 40–4 victory over Jamaica to qualify for the 2013 Rugby League World Cup for the first time.

The Tomahawks won a warm-up match against 4th-ranked France, defeating them 22–18 in Toulouse in the USA's best victory to date.

In the finals, they were drawn in a group with the Cook Islands and Wales as well as an inter-group game against Scotland. They began by beating the Cook Islands 32–0 and then Wales 24–16, before losing 22–8 to Scotland, although they still ended up winning their group. As group winners, they advanced to the quarter finals to face Australia, losing 62-0 to be eliminated from the tournament.

2014–present: USARL
Following the World Cup, the national team was put on hiatus while the governance dispute between the AMNRL and the USARL was resolved. The team subsequently lost the right to automatic qualification for the 2017 Rugby League World Cup. In November 2014, stewardship of the national team was transferred to the USARL, and the team was rebranded from Tomahawks to Hawks. Brian McDermott was subsequently appointed head coach and his first job was to help the USA re-secure the World Cup qualification that they first won four years earlier. The team performed the qualification tournament, held in the US, in December 2015. The team qualified for their second consecutive World Cup after winning both their matches.

The United States were drawn in a tough group with Fiji, Italy and Papua New Guinea. They lost their first game against Fiji 58-12, following it up with a 46-0 thumping by Italy and finally losing 64-0 in their final pool game against Papua New Guinea.

Coaching History Roster
Also see :Category:United States national rugby league team coaches.

Current squad
Head coach:  Sean Rutgerson

Squad selected for the 2019 Rugby League World Cup 9s:

 Squad selected for the 2021 Rugby League World Cup qualifiers:
Sean Hunt
Nick Newlin
Ryan Burroughs
Mike Elias
Brandon Anderson
Rafael Mendez
Jay Robinson
Dane Wilcoxen
Jerome Veve
Joel Luani
Chris Wiggins
Bureta Faraimo 
Junior Vaivai
Kyle Grinold
David Washington
Joe Eichner
Chris Frazier
Kyle Denham
Andrew Kneisly
Corey Makelim
Mark Offerdahl
Curtis Goddard
Connor Donehue
Cody Blackwell
Justin Branca
Eddie Pettybourne
Sonny Pettybourne
Danny Howard
Kristian Freed
CJ Cortalano

Players

Competitive Record 

USA national side's competitive record up to date as of 25 April 2021.

World Cup

The USA have competed in 2 World Cups. In 2007 they entered into qualifying for the 2008 World Cup but were unsuccessful. However, they qualified for the following 2013 World Cup and reached the quarter finals.

Colonial Cup

The Colonial Cup is an international Cup competition between the US and Canada.

World Cup 9s

World Nines results
 Tonga def. USA 26–4 (1997)
 Fiji def. USA 18–8 (1997)
 Cook Islands def. USA 24–6 (1997)
 Papua New Guinea def. USA 38–8 (1997)
 Western Samoa def. USA 30–10 (1997)
 Australia def. USA 24–0 (1997)
 Cook Islands def. USA 22–0 (1996)
 USA def. Morocco 18–4 (1996)
 Western Samoa def. USA 14–6 (1996)
 Australia def. USA 30–16 (1996)
 Scotland def. USA 12–6 (1996)

World Sevens results
 Illawarra def. USA* 18–6 (1997) *unofficial team
 USA* def. Japan 18–14 (1997) *unofficial team
 Italy def. USA* 22–0 (1997) *unofficial team
 Gold Coast def. USA* 40–8 (1996) *unofficial team
 USA* def. Japan 20–8 (1996) *unofficial team
 Melbourne def. USA* 18–14 (1996) *unofficial team
 Australian Aboriginals def. USA* 28–0 (1996) *unofficial team
 Tonga def. USA 20–4 (1995)
 USA def. Russia 28–8 (1995)
 USA def. Italy 22–4 (1995)
 USA def. Russia 20–6 (1995)
 Sydney Tigers def. USA 24–10 (1995)
 South Africa def. USA 20–8 (1994)
 New Zealand def. USA 20–12 (1994)
 France def. USA 18–12 (1994)
 Wainuiomata def. USA 34–8 (1993)
 South Sydney def. USA 28–6 (1993)
 Illawarra def. USA 28–4 (1993)
 Fiji def. USA 30–10 (1992)
 USA def. CIS Red Arrows 12–8 (1992)
 South Sydney def. USA 12–0 (1992)
 Newcastle def. USA 16–0 (1992)

Student results
 USA def. Japan 54–10 (1996)
 Wales def. USA 22–18 (1996)
 Western Samoa def. USA 82–8 (1996)
 New Zealand def. USA 62–10 (1996)
 USA def. Ireland 22–20 (1996)

Other representative results
 USA All Stars def. World Allies All Stars 27–26 (2001)
 Sydney def. USA All Stars 52–25 (1953)

Stadium
Since 2009, the USA have primarily used Hodges Stadium in Jacksonville to host international rugby league matches. Garthwaite Stadium in Conshohocken, Pennsylvania has also hosted several international rugby league fixtures.

See also
United States women's national rugby league team

References

External links
 American National Rugby League official site
 Google-Video
 American All Stars RL Team – rl1908.com

 
American National Rugby League
National rugby league teams
Rugby league in the United States